Diaphus theta, the California headlightfish, is a species of lanternfish found in the Eastern Pacific Ocean.

Size

References

Myctophidae
Taxa named by Rosa Smith Eigenmann
Taxa named by Carl H. Eigenmann
Fish described in 1890